Dokhtaran Castle is a historical castle located in Maragheh County in East Azerbaijan Province, The longevity of this fortress dates back to the Historical periods after Islam.

References 

Castles in Iran